David Paul Bennett (born 26 April 1960) is an English former professional footballer who played for Manchester City, Norwich City, MVV and FC Volendam, as a winger. In 1982 he made 15 appearances on loan with the Portland Timbers of the North American Soccer League.

References

1960 births
Living people
English footballers
Manchester City F.C. players
Norwich City F.C. players
MVV Maastricht players
FC Volendam players
English Football League players
Portland Timbers (1975–1982) players
North American Soccer League (1968–1984) players
Association football wingers
English expatriate footballers
English expatriate sportspeople in the Netherlands
English expatriate sportspeople in the United States
Expatriate footballers in the Netherlands
Expatriate soccer players in the United States